Kyle Elliot Howkins (born 4 May 1996) is an English footballer who plays as a defender.

He began his career at West Bromwich Albion, and enjoyed loan spells at Kidderminster Harriers, Mansfield Town, Cambridge United and Port Vale, before he joined Newport County on a permanent deal in June 2019. He joined Solihull Moors on loan in January 2021.

Career

West Bromwich Albion
Howkins began his career with West Bromwich Albion. He joined the club at the age of 11 before progressing through the academy. He signed scholarship forms, which eventually progressed through a third year. In January 2017, Howkins signed a professional contract to keep him at The Hawthorns until 2019.

On 23 October 2015, Howkins joined National League side Kidderminster Harriers on a 28-day youth loan. He made his league debut for the "Carpetmen" six days later, in a 1–0 win over Woking at Aggborough. He managed to establish himself in the first-team alongside Kelvin Langmead, with Jordan Tunnicliffe out injured, and was described by manager Dave Hockaday as "a lot of a monster, never mind a bit of a monster ... he's a big daft, galloot! He's got great height, he's a great athlete, he's big, he's strong he's up for the fight". Coach Darren Moore said that "he's learning invaluable lessons of the game" playing in Kiddy's relegation fight. His loan spell was extended until January, and he scored his first goal in senior football in a 2–1 defeat to Cheltenham Town on Boxing Day. He went on to make a total of ten appearances before being recalled by his parent club on 4 January.

Howkins joined League Two side Mansfield Town on loan in July 2016. He made his debut in the English Football League in a 3–2 victory at Newport County in the opening game of the season on 6 August. However he suffered a hamstring injury in an EFL Trophy Group Stage defeat to Doncaster Rovers on 30 August and was sidelined for a month. This led "Stags" boss Adam Murray to sign Alex Iacovitti on loan from Nottingham Forest to provide cover at centre-back. After returning to fitness he was sent-off for a second bookable offence in a 4–0 loss at Portsmouth. After extending his loan spell at Field Mill until the end of the 2016–17 season, Howkins soon suffered an injury that kept him out for two months. He ended the campaign with a total of 20 appearances to his name. Speaking in February, manager Steve Evans said that Howkins had "been excellent in all honesty... he's got a lot to do to become a Premier League player but he's on the right track".

On 12 August 2017, Howkins signed a six-month loan deal with League Two team Cambridge United. A hamstring injury kept him of out action for a month, before he made his debut, coming on as a late second-half substitute, in a 2–1 defeat at former club Mansfield Town on 23 September. He made only one start for Shaun Derry's "U's", in a 1–0 defeat to Southampton U23s at the Abbey Stadium on 3 October.

On 31 January 2018, he returned to League Two on loan at Port Vale until the end of the 2017–18 season. He was one of three centre-backs signed by manager Neil Aspin within the space of 48 hours. He impressed for the "Valiants" and Aspin stated his intention to try and bring Howkins back to Vale Park for the following season. However he missed the first half of the 2018–19 season with a knee injury, but said that upon returning to fitness "training with the likes of Gayle and Rodriguez has benefited me a lot". He did return on loan to Port Vale on 31 January 2019, ironically the day after Aspin resigned as manager. However injury problems meant that he featured only three times under new manager John Askey and returned to West Brom on 30 April.

Newport County
On 11 June 2019, Howkins joined League Two club Newport County on a two-year contract; "Exiles" manager Michael Flynn said that "Kyle is someone I've kept my eye on for almost over 2 years and even tried signing him on loan in the past. It's a fantastic deal for us because he's got a promising future ahead of him". On 3 August, he made his debut for Newport in the opening game of the season, a 2–2 draw with Mansfield Town at Rodney Parade. He scored his first goal for the "Ironsides" on 17 August, in a 1–0 home win over Plymouth Argyle. On 29 November, he had a nasty clash of heads with Maldon & Tiptree striker Charlee Hughes and had a fit after falling to the ground; he suffered a fractured skull and was out of action for six weeks. The 2019–20 was ended early in March due to the COVID-19 pandemic in England.

Howkins played the opening four games of the 2020–21 campaign before he was sidelined with a hamstring injury and fell out of Michael Flynn's fist-team plans having fell behind David Longe-King, Matthew Dolan, Mickey Demetriou, Ashley Baker, Scot Bennett and Joe Woodiwiss in the pecking order. On 21 January 2021, Howkins joined National League side Solihull Moors – managed by former West Brom coach James Shan – on loan for the remainder of the 2020–21 season. On 4 June 2021 it was announced that he would leave Newport County at the end of the season, following the expiry of his contract.

Career statistics

References

External links

1996 births
Living people
Sportspeople from Walsall
English footballers
Association football defenders
West Bromwich Albion F.C. players
Kidderminster Harriers F.C. players
Mansfield Town F.C. players
Cambridge United F.C. players
Port Vale F.C. players
Newport County A.F.C. players
Solihull Moors F.C. players
National League (English football) players
English Football League players